The mitosporic Ascomycota are a heterogeneous group of ascomycotic fungi whose common characteristic is the absence of a sexual state (anamorph); many of the pathogenic fungi in humans belong to this group.

Acremonium
Acrodontium
Alatospora
Anguillospora
Antennariella
Anungitopsis
Aphanocladium
Bispora
Brachyconidiella
Calcarisporium
Capnobotryella
Cephaliophora
Ceratocladium
Chaetasbolisia
Chaetomella
Clathrosporium
Colispora
Coniosporium
Corynespora
Curvicladium
Cytoplea
Dactylaria
Duddingtonia
Eladia
Endoconidioma
Engyodontium
Flagellospora
Fonsecaea
Geniculifera
Glarea
Gliocephalis
Goniopila
Gonytrichum
Gyoerffyella
Helminthosporium
Hormococcus
Humicola
Hyphozyma
Kabatina
Kendrickiella
Kloeckera
Kumanasamuha
Lecophagus
Lemonniera
Leptodontidium
Limaciniaseta
Lunulospora
Macrophoma
Macrophomina
Madurella
Microsphaeropsis
Moniliella
Myxocephala
Nakataea
Neoplaconema
Noosia
Ochroconis
Oosporidium
Phaeoisariopsis
Phaeomoniella
Phaeoramularia
Phaeosclera
Phaeoseptoria
Phaeotheca
Phaeotrichoconis
Phialemonium
Phoma
Polycytella
Pseudofusarium
Pseudotaeniolina
Raffaelea
Readeriella
Rhizopycnis
Rhizosphaera
Rhynchosporium
Robillarda
Saitoella
Sarcopodium
Sarocladium
Scleroconidioma
Sclerotium
Scolecobasidium
Scytalidium
Sirococcus
Spegazzinia
Sphaerographium
Spicellum
Spirosphaera
Stachybotrys
Stanjemonium
Symbiotaphrina
Synchaetomella
Termitaria
Tetrachaetum
Tetracladium
Thermomyces
Tilachlidium
Tricellulortus
Trichosporonoides
Trichothecium
Tricladium
Tritirachium
Tumularia
Verticimonosporium
Xenochalara
Zalerion

References

 https://www.uniprot.org/taxonomy/108599. Referred on 29/11/2011

Ascomycota
Biology-related lists